Bloukrans Pass may refer to one of the following:

 Bloukrans Pass (Western Cape), on the R102 between Plettenberg Bay and Jeffreys Bay
 Bloukrans Pass (Northern Cape), on the R355 between Ceres and Calvinia

See also 
 Bloukrans River (disambiguation)